is a Japanese motorcycle racer. He currently competes in the MotoE World Cup aboard an Energica Ego bike with Avant Ajo MotoE. He has also competed in the Supersport World Championship aboard a Honda CBR600RR.

Career

All Japan Road Race GP125/GP3 Championship

Born in Tokyo, Okubo started in the All Japan Road Race Championship GP125 class in 2008, riding for Endurance Honda, where he finished the season in 20th place overall with a best result of 13th at Tsukuba. For 2009 Okubo remained in the GP125 class but joined the 18 Garage Racing Team once again on a Honda. 2009 saw a significant improvement from 2008, with sixth overall in the championship; his best result in 2009 was sixth position at Okayama. Okubo once again rode with the 18 Garage Racing Team aboard a Honda in 2010, staying in the newly renamed J-GP3 class. Okubo opened the season with his first victory in the Japanese championship at Tsukuba, this was followed by another victory at Motegi, these victories along with two other podiums were enough to secure his first Japanese championship title. Okubo also competed in his first 125cc World Championship event as a wildcard at the Japanese round at Motegi, he qualified in 26th and finished the race just out of the points in 16th position. Deciding to try to defend his title in 2011, Okubo stayed in the J-GP3 class, along with 18 Garage Racing Team for the third consecutive year. Okubo only finished two of the five races, as he could only finish tenth overall. He once again received a wildcard entry to the 125cc World Championship for the Japanese round held at Motegi, he qualified 25th and finished just outside the points again in 17th.

Asia Dream Cup

Deciding not to remain in the Japanese championship in 2012, Okubo joined the one-make Asia Dream Cup aboard a Honda CBR250 for the inaugural season. The Asia Dream Cup, which runs alongside the Asia Road Racing Championship, spanned across six different countries in Asia. Okubo was engaged in an all out battle with fellow Japanese rider Hiroki Ono, which Okubo prevailed in by ten points ahead of Ono.

Return to All Japan Road Race GP3

For 2013, Okubo returned to the Japanese championship to try and recapture the J-GP3 title with the Hot Racing Honda squad, he eventually finished third overall with five third-place finishes his best results. He remained in the J-GP3 class with Hot Racing aboard a Honda NSF250R in 2014, he finished the season in sixth overall, with a second-place finish at Motegi being his best result. He also received a wildcard for the Motegi round of the 2014 Moto3 World Championship, he failed to finish the race after qualifying 26th.

All Japan Road Race ST600 Championship

In 2015 he made a class change as he stepped up to the ST600 series with Kohara Racing riding a stock Honda CBR600RR, he finished the season third overall after two podium finishes in the final rounds of the season at Okayama and Suzuka.

Supersport World Championship

In November 2015, it was announced that Okubo had signed to race for CIA Landlord Insurance Honda in the 2016 Supersport World Championship season, riding a Honda CBR600RR. He finished his rookie season 21st overall, scoring points in six of the twelve races. His best finish result was 10th place at  EuroSpeedway Lausitz. He remained in the class for the 2017 season, riding a Honda CBR600RR. He improved his final championship position to 15th overall, highlighted by a 6th place at Buriram International Circuit. In 2018 he switched to the Puccetti Racing squad, riding a Kawasaki ZX-6R. Okubo finished in 13th place in the championship, with 8th place at Circuito San Juan Villicum his best result. Okubo remained with Kawasaki Puccetti Racing in 2019.

MotoE World Cup

On February 2, 2021, it was announced that Okubo will compete in the 2021 MotoE World Cup as part of Avant Ajo MotoE, replacing Niki Tuuli.

Career statistics

Grand Prix motorcycle racing

By season

By class

Races by year
(key) (Races in bold indicate pole position; races in italics indicate fastest lap)

 Half points awarded as less than two thirds of the race distance (but at least three full laps) was completed.

Supersport World Championship

Races by year
(key) (Races in bold indicate pole position; races in italics indicate fastest lap)

References

External links
 
 

Japanese motorcycle racers
Living people
125cc World Championship riders
Sportspeople from Tokyo
1993 births
Moto3 World Championship riders
Supersport World Championship riders
MotoE World Cup riders